The 2020–21 Feyenoord Basketball season is the 67th season in the existence of the club and the 3rd as Feyenoord Basketball. The club played in the Dutch Basketball League (DBL) and NBB Cup.

Feyenoord finished 5th in the DBL and lost to Landstede Hammers in the quarterfinals.

Roster

Transactions

In 

|}

Out 

|}

Individual awards
DBL All-Defense Team: Juan Davis

References

External links
 Official website

Feyenoord
Feyenoord
Feyenoord Basketball seasons